is a mountain located in Yamakita, Kanagawa.

It belongs to Tanzawa-Ōyama Quasi-National Park. The area around the mountaintop had been used as a Kanagawa Prefectural Onoyama dairy cow breeding ranch (completed in 1968), but it was abolished as a prefectural ranch on March 31, 2016.

References

Mountains of Kanagawa Prefecture
Mountains under 1000 metres